The women's sabre fencing competition at the 2008 Summer Olympics in Beijing took place on August 9 at the Olympic Green Convention Centre.

The sabre competition consisted of a five-round single-elimination bracket with a bronze medal match between the two semifinal losers. Fencing was done to 15 touches or to the completion of three three-minute rounds if neither fencer reached 15 touches by then. At the end of time, the higher-scoring fencer was the winner; a tie resulted in an additional one-minute sudden-death time period. This sudden-death period was further modified by the selection of a draw-winner beforehand; if neither fencer scored a touch during the minute, the predetermined draw-winner won the bout.

Draw

Finals

Section 1

Section 2

Section 3

Section 4

Final classification

References
 Competition format

Fencing at the 2008 Summer Olympics
2008 in women's fencing
Women's events at the 2008 Summer Olympics